Following is a partial list of taxonomic authorities by name  —  for taxonomists with some common surnames.

Adams
 Andrew Leith Adams (1827–1882), Scottish zoologist
 Arthur Adams (1820–1878), English physician and naturalist, brother of Henry Adams
 Charles Baker Adams (1814–1853), American conchologist
 Charles Dennis Adams (C.D.Adams, 1920–), botanist
 Henry Adams (1813–1877), English naturalist and conchologist, brother of Arthur Adams
 Johannes Michael Friedrich Adams (Adams, 1780–1838), Russian botanist
 Joseph Edison Adams (J.E.Adams, 1904–1981), botanist
 Laurence George Adams (L.G.Adams, 1929–), botanist
 Robert Phillip Adams (R.P.Adams, 1939–), botanist

Chandler
 Donald S. Chandler, an entomologist
 Gregory T. Chandler, a botanist
 Harry Phylander Chandler (1917–1955), an American entomologist
 Marjorie E.J. Chandler, an English paleobotanist
 Peter Chandler, an entomologist

Clark
See  for species named after taxonomic authorities named Clark.
 Austin Hobart Clark (1880–1954), American zoologist
 Benjamin Preston Clark, English entomologist
 Eugenie Clark (1922–2015) (E. Clark), ichthyologist
 Hubert Lyman Clark (1870–1947) (H.L. Clark), zoologist specialist of echinoderms
 James Michael Clark (J.M. Clark)
 John Clark (1885–1956), Australian entomologist
 John L. Clark (J.L.Clark), botanist

Gray
See  for species named after taxonomic authorities named Graii.
 Asa Gray (1810–1888), American botanist (IPNI=A.Gray)
 George Robert Gray (1808–1872), British zoologist; son of Samuel Frederick Gray
 John Edward Gray (1800–1875), British zoologist; son of Samuel Frederick Gray (IPNI=J.E.Gray)
 Michael R. Gray, Australian arachnologist
 Samuel Frederick Gray (1766–1828), British botanist (IPNI =Gray)

Note: if the name refers to a botanist, it is most likely Samuel Frederick Gray; & if it refers to a zoologist it is most likely John Edward Gray

Schneider
 Gotthard Schneider (Gotth.Schneider), German lichenologist and teacher
 Johann Gottlob Schneider (1750–1822), German classicist and naturalist
 Camillo Karl Schneider (C.K.Schneider, 1876–1951), Austrian botanist
 Scott Alexander Schneider (born 1982), American coccidologist

Smith
See  for species named after taxonomic authorities named Smith.
 See List of taxonomic authorities named Smith

Thomson
 Carl Gustaf Thomson (1824–1899), Swedish entomologist - Thomson is his official abbreviation
 James Thomson (1828–1897), American entomologist
 Scott Thomson (born 1966), Australian taxonomist and palaeontologist (turtles). Generally abbreviated as S. Thomson
 Thomas Thomson  (1817–1878), British physician and botanist - Thomson is his official botanical author abbreviation according to IPNI

Walker
See  for species named after taxonomic authorities named Walker.
 Alick Donald Walker (A. Walker, 1925–1999), British palaeontologist
 Bryant Walker (1856–1936), American amateur malacologist
 Cyril Alexander Walker (1939–2009), British palaeontologist
 Edmund Murton Walker (E.M. Walker, 1877–1969), Canadian entomologist
 Francis Walker (F. Walker, 1809–1874),  entomologist
 Warren F. Walker (W.F. Walker)

See also
 — alphabetical.
 — alphabetical.
 — all taxa fields, alphabetical.
 :Category: Taxonomists

 
.taxonomic authorities by name
taxonomic authorities